Chudleigh is a town in Devon, England.

Chudleigh may also refer to:

Places
 Chudleigh Knighton, village in Devon, England
 Chudleigh, Tasmania, village near Mole Creek, Tasmania, Australia

People
 Chudleigh baronets, of Ashton, Devon
 Elizabeth Chudleigh (1720-1788), English noble, known for her bigamy scandal
 James Chudleigh (c.1618–1643), English military officer during the first period of the English Civil War.
 Mary Chudleigh (1656–1710), English writer
 Ted Chudleigh (born 1943), Canadian politician

See also
Chudley (disambiguation)